Carol Tecla Christ (born 1944) is an American academic administrator. In March 2017, she was named the 11th Chancellor of the University of California, Berkeley, the first woman to hold that position. She succeeded outgoing Chancellor Nicholas B. Dirks on July 1, 2017.

Education
Christ was born in New York City. In 1966, she graduated with high honors in English from Douglass College, the women's college at Rutgers University. She received an MPhil in 1969 and a PhD in 1970 in English from Yale University.

Career
In 1970, Christ joined the faculty at the University of California, Berkeley, and was chair of the English department from 1985 to 1988. In 1988, she was appointed dean of humanities, mathematics, and natural sciences. She also served as provost and dean of the College of Letters and Sciences. In 1994, Christ was appointed vice chancellor, assistant manager, and provost (and later became executive vice chancellor) at Berkeley. Christ was the highest-ranking female administrator at Berkeley until she returned to full-time teaching in 2000.

Christ became the 10th president of Smith College in 2002. At Smith, Christ led a strategic planning process to identify the distinctive intellectual traditions of the Smith curriculum and foster initiatives to further develop students’ essential capacities. Throughout her administrative career, Christ has maintained an active program of teaching and research. She has published two books: The Finer Optic: The Aesthetic of Particularity in Victorian Poetry and Victorian and Modern Poetics. She also edited a Norton Critical Edition of George Eliot’s The Mill on the Floss and co-edited the Norton Anthology of English Literature and Victorian Literature and The Victorian Visual Imagination. Until recently, she was professor of English at Smith, offering seminars on science and literature and on the arts.

Christ was the president of Smith College from 2002 to 2013. She announced in May 2012 that she had, along with the Board of Trustees, begun the search for her successor. She retired in June 2013.

In May 2016, Christ returned to her role as Berkeley's Executive Vice Chancellor and Provost (interim), replacing Claude Steele, who stepped down. On March 13, 2017, University of California President Janet Napolitano named Christ as Berkeley's new Chancellor-elect, and three days later, the Regents of the University of California confirmed her appointment. On July 1, 2017, Christ became the 11th Berkeley Chancellor and the first woman to serve in this role, succeeding Chancellor Nicholas B. Dirks.

At the start of her first academic year as chancellor, Christ responded to the 2017 Berkeley protests in which protests against conservative speakers led to violent outbreaks. In a letter to the campus which quoted John Stuart Mill, she affirmed the administration's commitment to free speech and urged the community to remember its roots as part of the Free Speech Movement. She later took other steps in this direction which included moderating a panel on free expression and committing $800,000 to providing security for controversial speakers. In a September 2017 interview, she stated that some students find the concept of free speech objectionable.

Christ is a trustee of Central European University, served on the board of the Consortium on Financing Higher Education (COFHE) and was a trustee of Sarah Lawrence College and Dominican University of California.

Honors
Christ was elected a Fellow of the American Academy of Arts and Sciences in 2004 and a Member of the American Philosophical Society in 2013. Additionally, she was awarded Yale University's Wilbur Cross Medal in 2007, and in 2011, the American College of Greece awarded her an honorary doctorate.

Personal life 
Christ's late husband, Paul Alpers, was a scholar of Renaissance English literature and the founding director of Berkeley's Townsend Center for the Humanities until his death in 2013. She has two grown children, Jonathan and Elizabeth Sklute, from a previous marriage, as well as two grandchildren. She currently lives in Berkeley, California.

Selected publications

References

1944 births
Living people
American women academics
American academics of English literature
Fellows of the American Academy of Arts and Sciences
Women heads of universities and colleges
Literary critics of English
Writers from New York City
Rutgers University alumni
University of California, Berkeley College of Letters and Science faculty
Yale Graduate School of Arts and Sciences alumni
Members of the American Philosophical Society
Presidents of Smith College
21st-century American women